Mahamat Hissene (died 7 July 2021) was a Chadian politician who served as the minister of communications and spokesman in the government of Youssouf Saleh Abbas. He also served in the National Assembly.

References

20th-century births
2021 deaths
Communication ministers of Chad
Members of the National Assembly (Chad)